"Thug Devotion" is the lead single by American hip hop collective Mo Thugs taken from their debut studio album Family Scriptures, released in 1996 via Mo Thugs/Relativity Records. Recording sessions took place at Private Island Trax in Los Angeles. It features contributions from Layzie Bone, Krayzie Bone, Tré, Ken Dawg and Souljah Boy. Produced by Bobby Jones, it contains replayed elements from Earth, Wind & Fire's song "Devotion" written by Philip Bailey and Maurice White.

The single topped the Official New Zealand Music Chart and was certified Platibum by the Recording Industry Association of New Zealand.

Charts

Certifications

See also
List of number-one singles from the 1990s (New Zealand)

References

External links

1996 songs
Mo Thugs songs
1996 debut singles
Relativity Records singles
Songs written by Layzie Bone
Songs written by Krayzie Bone
Number-one singles in New Zealand